İbrahimli is a surname. The surname is derived from the male given name İbrahim (related to Abraham).

People with the surname 
 Ismayil Ibrahimli, Azerbaijani footballer, attacking midfielder of Qarabağ FK and the Azerbaijan U21.

Other 
 İbrahimli, Mut, a small village in Mut district of Mersin Province, Turkey
 İbrahimli, Kastamonu, a village in the District of Kastamonu, Kastamonu Province, Turkey

Azerbaijani-language surnames
Patronymic surnames
Surnames from given names